Kentucky Route 221 (KY 221) is a  state highway in the U.S. state of Kentucky. The highway connects mostly rural areas of Bell, Harlan, Perry, and Leslie counties with the Daniel Boone National Forest.

Route description

Bell County
KY 221 begins at an intersection with KY 66 east of Dorton Branch, within Bell. It travels in an easterly direction, paralleling the ironically-named Straight Creek. In Jenson, it intersects the southern terminus of KY 2013. It curves to the northeast and crosses over Straight Creek. The highway immediately intersects the southern terminus of KY 1630 just outside of Kettle Island. It also crosses over some CSX railroad tracks and continues to the northeast. After crossing Mill Creek, it crosses over the CSX tracks again and enters Laurel Ford. There, it briefly heads to the north-northwest before resuming its northeast direction. In Stoney Fork, it crosses over Stoney Fork and intersects the southern terminus of KY 2011 (Stoney Fork Road).

Harlan County

After entering Harlan County, KY 221 enters Tacky Town. There, it crosses over Big Run and Laurel Branch and intersects the northern terminus of KY 3448. It begins to travel along the southern edge of the Boone Forestlands Wildlife Management Area. It has a crossing of Salt Trace Branch and an intersection with the southern terminus of KY 1780. The highway then curves to the east and crosses over Straight Creek one final time before curving to the southeast and leaving the creek. It intersects the southern terminus of KY 3466 (Bigelow Road) and then passes Green Hills Elementary School. Right after that, it intersects U.S. Route 421 (US 421). The two highways travel concurrently in a northeasterly direction, along the southern edge of Daniel Boone National Forest. When they split, KY 221 enters the forest proper. It heads to the east, passing Green and Middleton Cemeteries. It resumes its northeastern direction, then crosses over Laurel Fork and intersects the southern terminus of KY 2009. It then intersects the southern terminus of KY 3465 (Abner Branch Road). In Divide, it intersects the northern terminus of KY 2010. In Pine Mountain, it curves to the north and intersects the western terminus of KY 510. KY 221 then heads to the north-northwest and parallels Greasy Creek, with one crossing of the creek. In Big Laurel, the highway crosses over Big Laurel Creek and intersects the eastern terminus of KY 2008. KY 221 then heads to the northeast, paralleling Big Laurel Creek. It then curves to the north and north-northwest and enters Perry County.

Perry and Leslie counties
KY 221 doesn't have any major intersections in Perry County. It curves to the southwest and enters Leslie County. It curves to the north and northeast and meets its eastern terminus, an intersection with KY 699 (Cutshin Road).

Major intersections

See also

References

0221
Transportation in Bell County, Kentucky
Transportation in Harlan County, Kentucky
Transportation in Perry County, Kentucky
Transportation in Leslie County, Kentucky